Albert Mokeyev (4 January 1936 – 27 February 1969) is a former Soviet modern pentathlete and Olympic Champion. He competed at the 1964 Summer Olympics in Tokyo, where he won a gold medal in the team competition (together with Igor Novikov and Viktor Mineyev), and a bronze medal in the individual competition.

References

1936 births
1969 deaths
Russian male modern pentathletes
Soviet male modern pentathletes
Olympic modern pentathletes of the Soviet Union
Modern pentathletes at the 1964 Summer Olympics
Olympic gold medalists for the Soviet Union
Olympic bronze medalists for the Soviet Union
Olympic medalists in modern pentathlon
Medalists at the 1964 Summer Olympics